Double Trap is a 1986 Soviet crime film directed by Aloizs Brenčs about a group of criminals in Riga.

Plot

Riga, Latvian Soviet Socialist Republic. A criminal organisation illegally exports artworks to the West, as well as selling anti-Soviet literature and pornographic video tapes. A policeman goes undercover in an effort to bring the gang to justice.

Release

Double Trap was released in the Soviet Union in January 1986. It was the highest-grossing film in the Soviet Union for 1986, with 42.9 million tickets sold.

References

External links

1986 films
Films directed by Aloizs Brenčs
Films set in Riga
Films shot in Latvia
Police detective films
Soviet crime drama films
Riga Film Studio films
Latvian-language films
1980s Russian-language films
1986 multilingual films
Soviet multilingual films